Schasicheila is a genus of land snails with an operculum. It is a genus of terrestrial gastropod mollusks in the subfamily Helicininae of the family Helicinidae.

Species
 Schasicheila alata (L. Pfeiffer, 1849)
 Schasicheila fragilis Pilsbry, 1899
 Schasicheila hidalgoana Dall, 1897
 Schasicheila hinkleyi Pilsbry, 1920
 Schasicheila minuscula (L. Pfeiffer, 1859)
 Schasicheila misantlensis P. Fischer & Crosse, 1893
 Schasicheila nicoleti Shuttleworth, 1852
 Schasicheila palmeri Dall, 1905
 Schasicheila pannucea (Morelet, 1849)
 Schasicheila vanattai Pilsbry, 1899
 Schasicheila walkeri Hinkley, 1920
 Schasicheila xanthia Pilsbry, 1909
Synonyms
 Schasicheila bahamensis L. Pfeiffer, 1862: synonym of Alcadia bahamensis (L. Pfeiffer, 1862) (unaccepted > superseded combination, basionym)
 Schasicheila pilsbryi A. J. Wagner, 1911: synonym of Schasicheila misantlensis P. Fischer & Crosse, 1893

References

 Bank, R. A. (2017). Classification of the Recent terrestrial Gastropoda of the World. Last update: July 16th, 2017

External links
 

Helicinidae
Gastropod genera